The year 1505 in science and technology included a number of events, some of which are listed below.

Biology
 approx. date – Leonardo da Vinci produces his Codex on the Flight of Birds.

Exploration
 Portuguese reach the Comoros archipelago.
 Bermuda is discovered by Spanish explorer Juan de Bermúdez.
 1505 or 1506 – Portuguese explorer Gonçalo Álvares is the first to sight what will later be known as Gough Island.

Mathematics
 Scipione del Ferro solves the depressed cubic equation.

Mineralogy
 Ulrich Rülein von Calw publishes  ("A well-ordered and useful little book about how to seek and find mines") in Augsburg, the first scientific treatment of mining in Germany.

Technology
 First known reference to a wheellock gun.

Births
 May 20 – Levinus Lemnius, Dutch physician (d. 1568)
 Giovan Battista Bellaso, Italian cryptologist

Deaths
 Gabriele Zerbi, Veronese gerontologist (b. 1445; sawn in half by disaffected sons of a deceased patient)

References

 
16th century in science
1500s in science